Dave Apollon (born Denis Apollonov, ; February 23, 1898 – May 30, 1972) was an American mandolin player.

Today Dave Apollon is regarded as one of the most innovative and influential mandolinists of the twentieth century, whose more notable recordings and performances include Two Guitars, Hora staccato by Grigoraș Dinicu and Zigeunerweisen aka "Gypsy Airs" by Pablo de Sarasate. His styles include Gypsy and various kinds of European folk music. He is also regarded as one of the first jazz mandolinists, with such memorable recordings as Who and St. Louis Blues.

Early life 
Apollon was born in 1898, to a Jewish family in the city of Kiev, which was at the time part of Russia. At an early age, he played the violin but abandoned the instrument after taking a fervent interest in an old bowl back mandolin his father kept in  the house.

Career 
By age 14 Apollon had already founded an ensemble and was performing professionally in a local movie theatre.

In 1919 he moved to New York City and almost immediately got a job in vaudeville, where he floored audiences with stunning virtuosity.

In 1929 he made the first of his musical shorts, something he would continue with for much of his career. In 1941 he was a member of the touring company of "Boys and Girls Together". In 1946 he met and played with Django Reinhardt while the legendary guitarist was on tour with Duke Ellington in New York. In early 1950, he released his version of the No. 1 hit "Third Man Theme" (made famous by  Anton Karas and Guy Lombardo, among others) on the National label (#9104). The flip side was "The Cafe Mozart Waltz". "Billboard" described the single as "Sensational ... new ... and different."  Apollon died in 1972, after a career that spanned over fifty years.

References

External links 
Biography
page with newspaper clippings of Dave Apollon, 1933-1942
Picture of Dave's Philippine Orchestra.
Portrait of a young Dave Apollon as vaudeville performer.
Page that lists some films Dave Apollon was in.

1898 births
1972 deaths
Mandolinists
Russian musicians
Russian mandolinists